Bakaldun-e Gholam Shah (also Romanized as Bakaldūn-e Gholām Shāh) is a village in Rostam-e Yek Rural District, in the Central District of Rostam County, Fars Province, Iran. At the 2006 census, its population was 23, in 5 families.

References 

Populated places in Rostam County